Masjed Soleyman (also Romanized as Masjedsoleimān, Masjed-e Soleymān, Masjed Soleiman, and Masjid-i-Sulaiman) is a city and capital of Masjed Soleyman County, Khuzestan Province, Iran. At the 2006 census, its population was 206,121, in 51,530 families.

People
The city of Masjed Soleyman is home to a large Bakhtiyari population of the Haft-lang tribe. The Bakhtiaris occupy the mountain tract in South-West Persia lying roughly between longitudes 31 to 34 N and 48 40' to 51 E, bound on the south by the plains of Khuzistan and on the north by the districts of Chahar Mahal, Faridan, and Khonsar where the central Iranian Plateau blends into the great southern mountain range. Bakhtiaris were semi-nomadic, and their livelihood depended on the survival of their herds of sheep, cattle, and horses. The four main tribal divisions of Haft Lang are Duraki, Babadi, Bakhtiarwand, and Dinaruni, who are then divided into lesser clans.

Climate 
At Masjed-Soleyman, the summers are long, sweltering, arid, and clear and the winters are cool, dry, and mostly clear. Over the course of the year, the temperature typically varies from 45 °F to 112 °F and is rarely below 38 °F or above 117 °F. The best time of year to visit Masjed-Soleyman is from mid-September to late October. Masjed Soleyman is classified as having a hot semi-arid climate (Köppen climate classification: BSh).

History 

The city of Masjid Soleyman is among the ancient cities of the early Mesopotamian empire of Elam which was originally known as Assak, but was changed to Parsomash by the early Achemenids. In 1955, Roman Ghirshman discovered evidence of human inhabitation dating to 10,000 years ago in Pepdeh cave in vicinity of the current city of Lali, making it one of the oldest inhabited sites in the Khuzestan plain. Ghirshman's excavations in the area of Masjed Soleyman lead him to believe that Parsomash (present-day Masjed Soleyman) was the oldest capital of the Achaemenid Kingdom. The remains of an ancient fire-temple known locally as Sar-masjid and attributed to the legendary pre-historic king Houshang, and the ruins of an Achaemenid palace known locally as Bard- Neshandeh which is known as the birthplace of Teispes, grandfather of Cyrus the Great are among the archaeological ruins in this city. Under the Seleucids and Ashkanians the city of Masjid Solieman remained an important city. During the Sassanid period canals and weir-bridges were built, resulting into the cultivation of tobacco and cereals in the region. The ruins of such edifices can be seen in the Tembi region, Godar Landar and Dow-Paloon region (near Izeh); however, following the Muslim conquest of Iran, many of the ancient monolithic structures of the region were demolished and the region was ruled by rulers imposed by the Umayyad Caliphs and remained relatively obscure, until the Qajar era when it became a center for the tar trade and its name was changed to Tol-Ghor, with its borders being limited from the Karun river's Western bank to the tar springs; however, with the advent of the discovery of oil in the region, this city was named Jahangiri, but after the first oil well began production it was renamed Maydan-Nafton. In 1924, the National Council of Iran through an edict from Mohammad Reza Pahlavi officially changed the city's name to Masjid Soleiman.

Masjid Soleyman in the 20th century 
Masjed Soleyman regained importance with the discovery of oil and the erecting of the first oil well in the middle east by D'Arcy's concession. In 1900, he agreed to fund a search for oil and minerals in Persia headed by Wolff, Ketabchee and Cotte, although D'Arcy never visited Persia himself. Negotiations with the reigning monarch Mozaffar al-Din Shah Qajar began in 1901, and with the offer of £20,000 (£ million today), for a sixty-year concession to explore for oil—later, the D'Arcy concession—was secured in May, covering , and stipulated that D'Arcy would have the oil rights to the entire country except for five provinces in Northern Iran. In exchange, the Iranian government was given 16% of the oil company's annual profits, an agreement that would remain in effect until the Iranian Revolution. After the D'Arcy concession, the British government became much more concerned with the stability of Iran because of their reliance on the country's vast oil reserves.

The Constitutional Revolution
Ḥossain Qolī Khan Haft Lang was appointed superintendent (nāẓem) of the Baḵtīārīs by the Shah in 1862 and head of the tribe (īlḵān) in 1867. He was the first recipient of this title, and in the tribe he became known by the surname Īlḵānī. In 1882 the Shah caused him to be murdered and replaced by his brother Emām Qolī Khan, surnamed Ḥājī Īlḵānī. From then almost without interruption until the abolition of the title khan in 1956, the successive heads of the tribe were descendants of one or the other of the two brothers. The Haft Lang tribe played a significant role; particularly during the advent of the country's Constitutional Revolution (1905–1907). This event largely succeeded as a result of the Bakhtari tribal coalition military campaign lead by Ali-Gholi Khan, Sardar Asaad II, a chieftain of the Haft-lang tribe and his brother Najaf Qoli Khan Bakhtiari- Saad ad-Daula (also referred to as Samsam-os Saltane) whom in 1909 marched up to the gates of Tehran, and eventually deposed Mohammad Ali Shah Qajar (r. 1907–1909). This event led to the abdication of Mohammad Ali Shah Qajar (r. 1907–1909) in 1909, and his exile to Russia. This incident secured Saad ad-Daula the position of Prime Minister in the period that followed the abdication of the Qajar Shah. Nonetheless, with Russian backing, the Shah would attempt to regain his throne in 1911 by landing with a coalition of forces at Astarabad . However, his efforts to reclaim his throne would bear no fruit. In this sense, the Bakhtiaris played a critical role in saving the revolution from the Qajar forces.

The Pahlavi era  
With the expansion of Bakhtiari influence, influential policy makers (particularly in Tehran) began to worry regarding the potential Bakhtiari takeover of Persia's affairs. Prior to this point, the Bakhtiari had largely remained within their own territorial boundaries.In February 1921, the said policy makers instigated a coup by which Reza Pahlavi the commander of the entire Cossack Brigade which was based in Qazvinordered his troops to march towards Tehran and seized the capital. He forced the dissolution of the government and installed Zia ol Din Tabatabaee as the new prime minister.In 1925, Reza Pahlavi was appointed as the legal monarch of Iran by the decision of Iran's constituent assembly. The assembly deposed Ahmad Shah Qajar, the last Shah of the Qajar dynasty, and amended Iran's 1906 constitution to allow selection of Reza Pahlavi as the Shah of Iran. The Bakhtiari influence in Iranian politics thus waned, but they would continue to play an important role within the early 20th century politics of Iran. Reza Shah Pahlavi (r. 1925–1941) made the destruction of the Bakhtiari influence his mission; moreover, the existence of oil on Bakhtiari territory further motivated the Pahlavi monarch to undermine the autonomy of the tribe, and force its population to adhere to the commands of the central government. Reza Shah Pahlavi would eventually execute a few noteworthy tribal leaders to crush Bakhtiari autonomy and maintain control over the tribe. Amongst the executed Khans was Mohammad Reza Khan (Sardar-e-Fateh), whose son later became the Pahlavi Prime Minister Shapour Bakhtiar. The latter event was a turning point for Bakhtiari and their rise within Iranian politics.

The discovery of oil in the early 20th century
In the late 19th century Britain's Royal Navy, under the leadership of Sir Winston Churchill decided to shift its fuel source from coal to oil; therefore the British admiralty and the War office became the de facto force behind the British government's quest for oil. During the 1890s, research and reports were collected by the British foreign office indicating that Persia had great oil potential. The British Foreign office selected William Knox D'Arcy, a millionaire investor, and provided him with the reports, promising him greater wealth and governmental support if he invested in the excavation of oil. D'Arcy agreed and sent out representatives to Tehran to win a concession that would give him the exclusive rights to prospect for oil in Persia. On 16 April 1901 negotiations commenced between D'Arcy's representatives and the Qajar monarch Mozzafar al-Din Shah over a potential oil concession.[4] On 28 May 1901, Shah Mozzafar al-Din signed an 18 article concession which exclusively gave D'Arcy the rights to prospect, explore, exploit, transport and sell natural gas, petroleum, asphalt and mineral waxes in Persia.[7] This concession also granted D'Arcy these rights for a 60-year period, and it covered an area of 1,242,000 square kilometers.[8] or roughly three quarters of the country. In 1902, a drilling team under George B. Reynolds was sent to Chiah Surkh near the current Iran-Iraq border and in 1904 discovered oil; however, he and his team suffered much hardship and the venture had put a strain on D'arcy's funds in as such that he had already spent £160,000, and was overdrawn at Lloyds Bank by £177,000. In 1905, the British Admiralty fearing the possible selling of the concession to its rivals in the Middle east convinced D'Arcy through an elaborate ruse to seek financial support from Burmah Oil Company Ltd., and in 1905 the Concession Syndicate was established which was later renamed as the Anglo Persian Oil Co. in 1909.[18]

The infusion of capital provided by Burmah Oil allowed for the exploration of oil to continue; however, drilling operations shifted to southwestern Persia, and all drilling equipment was shipped to a new drilling site at Masjid-i-Suleiman.[19]  Once again Reynolds encountered problems in this region with hostile tribes and the local population. Reynolds often had to pay them a high fee and guarantee them a share of profits in order to protect the concession.[20] In 1907,due to no success in findings, D'Arcy sold off the majority of his shares to Burmah Oil for £203,067 cash and £900,000 in shares, allowing Burmah to become the major shareholder of the company.[15]. At 4:00 am on 26 May 1908, commercial quantities of oil were struck at the Masjid-i-Suleiman site and a fifty-foot gusher of petroleum shot up the no. 1 drilling rig.[22]

In April 1909, D'Arcy was appointed a director of the newly founded Anglo-Persian Oil Company (APOC), which would later become British Petroleum (BP). By 1911, APOC had run a pipeline from the oil field in Masjid-i- Suleiman to a refinery at Abadan.

Notable people 
 Sardar Asaad Bakhtiari (1856–1917), a chieftain of the Bakhtiari Haft Lang tribe and one of the primary figures of the Persian Constitutional Revolution
 Bibi Maryam Bakhtiari (1874–1937), revolutionary and activist of the Iranian Constitutional Revolution who was the daughter of Hossein Gholi Khan Bakhtiari,and the sister of Ali-Qoli Khan Bakhtiari 
 Soraya Esfandiary Bakhtiyari (1932–2001), Queen of the Imperial State of Iran and second wife of Shah Mohammad Reza Pahlavi
Bahman Ala'eddin (Masood Bakhtiari) (1940–2006), musician, music historian, teacher and renown singer in the Bakhtiari dialect.
 Frank Nezhadpournia (1971–), Anglo Iranian Pilot, Karate Master, Author. The first Iranian to volunteer for military service in Iran after receiving a Presidential Invite.
 Bijan Allipour (1949–), Iranian business executive. former CEO of NISOC.
 Mehran Karimi Nasseri (1945–2022), Iranian refugee who lived in the departure lounge of Terminal One in Charles de Gaulle Airport from 26 August 1988 until July 2006
 Habib Far Abbasi (1997–), footballer
 Mohsen Rezaei (1954–), Iranian politician, economist and former military commander
Laleh Bakhtiar, author and former professor at the University of Chicago, who wrote a feminist re-interpretation of the Koran.
Rostam Amir Bakhtiar, Chief of Imperial Protocol (1953–1979).
Abbasgholi Bakhtiar, Minister of Industries & Mines (1979).
Abdolhamid Bakhtiar, Majles Deputy.
Abolhassan Bakhtiar, Iranian Ambassador to Canada (1979).
Agha Khan Bakhtiar, Minister of Labor (1957–1958), Head of the National Iranian Oil Company.
Gholam-Reza Bakhtiar, Sardar Bakhtiar, Deputy Governor of Esfahan.
Rudi Bakhtiar, former CNN and FOX TV news anchor and journalist.
Shahpour Bakhtiar, politician and Prime Minister of Iran (1979).
Teymur Bakhtiar, Iranian general and head of Savak.
Behnoosh Bakhtiari, Iranian actress.
David Bakhtiari, NFL player and offensive tackle for the Green Bay Packers.
Behrouz Bakhtiar Successful businessman and owner of Crosskeys Vineyards
Gholam-Hossein Bakhtiari (Sardar Mohtashem), Minister of War (1911–13, 1918).
Pezhman Bakhtiari, poet (1900–1974).
Shaghayegh Dehghan, Iranian television actress, half Bakhtiari.
Khalil Esfandiary-Bakhtiary, Iranian Ambassador to West Germany (1952–1961).
Mirza Hideyatu'llah Ashtiani Bakhtiari (d.1892), Iran's finance minister during the Qajar period.
Eman Mobali, football player.
Zargham Saltaneh, Ebrahim, commander and instrumental figure in the Constitutional Revolution of 1909.
Nasir Khan, Sardar Jang, Governor of Yazd.
Niloufar Bakhtiar Bakhtiari, founder of NBB Design London, Interior Architecture.
Bahram Akasheh, Iran's leading experts on earthquakes

References 

Populated places in Masjed Soleyman County
Cities in Khuzestan Province